Sarangesa majorella, commonly known as the lesser blue-dusted elfin, is a species of butterfly in the family Hesperiidae. It is found in Guinea, Sierra Leone, Liberia, Ivory Coast, Ghana, Togo, Nigeria, Cameroon, the Republic of the Congo and the Central African Republic. The habitat consists of forests.

References

Butterflies described in 1891
Celaenorrhinini
Butterflies of Africa